Wierzbno  is a village in the administrative district of Gmina Domaniów, within Oława County, Lower Silesian Voivodeship, in south-western Poland.

The village has an approximate population of 1,450.

History
The name of the village is of Polish origin and comes from the word wierzba, which means "willow". The village was once a possession of the Saint Vincent Monastery in Wrocław. In 1840, it had a population of 796, and in 1885 it had a population of 863, mostly employed in flax, rapeseed and fruit cultivation.

Transport
The Voivodeship road 346 runs through Wierzbno, and the A4 motorway runs nearby, south-west of the village.

Notable people
Szymon Kołecki (born 1981), Polish Olympic Champion weightlifter

References

Wierzbno